Wallangarra is a rural town and locality in the Southern Downs Region, Queensland, Australia on the border with New South Wales.

Wallangarra is on the Queensland side of the border and Jennings is on the New South Wales side.

Geography 
Wallangarra lies in a valley between two ranges of mountains, which are branches of the Great Dividing Range. It is 878 m above sea level. There is a gap between the more Westerly range at Wyberba, about five kilometres north of Wallangarra. This gap has made Wallangarra the major inland border crossing for the New England Highway and what was the first railway line between Brisbane and Sydney. It is situated on the northern periphery of the New England Peppermint Grassy Woodland.

History 

In 1885, the Queensland Government announced that a town would be formed where the railway line between Queensland and New South Wales would meet. Two railway stations were created within the area. One was named Wallan-garra railway station and the town took its name from the station but used the spelling Wallangarra (with most people using the same spelling for the railway station). Bald Mountain railway station was the other railway station and is now abandoned.

Wallangarra Provisional School opened on 13 February 1888. On 1 January 1909, it became Wallangarra State School.

The railway was the only rail link between Queensland and New South Wales until a standard gauge track was completed via Kyogle in 1930, with the completion of the bridge over the Clarence River at Grafton. From that time on, the Wallangarra railway station lessened in importance. Scheduled rail services ended in 1997. In 2003, after major refurbishment, the station was reopened as a museum. The railway line from Stanthorpe to Wallangarra has continued to be maintained and steam trains taking tourists to Wallangarra occasionally operate.

The Anderson Meat Packing Company was restarted by Mr. A.W. Anderson in 1938 after a 15-month closure. Until 1982 it operated a large beef abattoir at Wallangarra. Anderson's employed in excess of 400 workers at the Wallangarra plant. The plant was located on the border so as to take advantage of rail lines from both Queensland and NSW.

During World War II, the Commonwealth Government created a general army store on the Queensland side of the border, and an ammunition dump on the New South Wales side. Dual gauge tracks were run to each store. Access to the army stores was via Margetts St, one of the main roads in the town. The late Muriel Daphne Verdun Nicolson lived at 30 Margetts St from before WWII until her death in 2001. During WWII she reported that the flow of trucks and materiel went on all day and night.

Wallangarra Cemetery was established in 1953.

On 12 September 1964 St Gabrielle's Anglican Church was dedicated by Bishop John Hudson. Its closure circa 2013 was approved by Bishop Robert Nolan. The church building has been sold into private ownership but remains at 54 Merinda Street.

Taking advantage of the rail junction Riverina Stock Feeds operated a packing plant opposite the Wallangarra railway station for many years until 1995. After that it moved to Warwick, a city  to the north. Warwick also has a major Woolworths warehouse. The Chairman of Woolworths who located the warehouse at Warwick grew up in Wallangarra.

Circa 2005 Thomas Foods International opened Australia's largest mutton works opened on a new site just to the east of the town. The mutton produced is Halal, and most of it is exported to Arab countries. The abattoir shut down in July 2016 for "the short to medium term" blaming low stock numbers and poor global trading conditions.

Heritage listings 
Wallangarra has a number of heritage-listed sites, including:
 Woodlawn Street: Wallangarra railway station

Economy
As of 2013, the Wallangarra Stores Depot remains a major Australian Army logistics facility. It is used to store a wide range of engineering and general equipment, clothing, and tents. Bulk fuel storage handling apparatus are also held at the site. The munitions storage facility is also still active in Jennings.

Education
Wallangarra State School is a government primary (Prep-6) school for boys and girls at 50 Callandoon Street. In 2018, the school had an enrolment of 76 students with 4 teachers (3 full-time equivalent) and 6 non-teaching staff (3 full-time equivalent).

There is no secondary school in Wallangarra. The nearest government secondary school is Stanthorpe State High School in Stanthorpe to the north-east.

Facilities

The Wallangarra Cemetery is in McCall Street.

Amenities
The Wallangarra branch of the Queensland Country Women's Association has its rooms at 52 Rockwell Street.

Attractions 
Wallangarra is situated on the picturesque Granite Belt, and is bounded by Sundown National Park to the West and Girraween National Park to the East.

Beehive Dam 
It is a popular fishing spot as it is stocked with golden perch, Murray cod and silver perch by the Jennings Wallangarra Fishing Club.

Notable former residents 
Rugby league legend Billy Moore lived in Wallangarra as a child. He is best known for playing for the North Sydney Bears and the Queensland State of Origin team. He was born in Tenterfield, New South Wales as this was the closest hospital.

Climate 

Wallangarra is the coldest (and snowiest) town in Queensland, due to its altitude and extreme southerly location in the state. Wallangarra holds the record for the lowest maximum temperature in Queensland,  on 3 July 1984. However due to its exposed location, minimum temperatures are not particularly low; towns of significantly lower altitude such as Warwick and Oakey frequently record lower minima, and especially Stanthorpe of similar altitude but much flatter topography (which in turn causes warmer maximum temperatures compared to Wallangarra).

References

External links

 
 

Towns in Queensland
Towns in the Darling Downs
Southern Downs Region
1885 establishments in Australia
Populated places established in 1885
Queensland in World War II
Localities in Queensland